Victor Mitropoulos (Βίκτωρ Μητρόπουλος, Βίκτωρας Μητρόπουλος, born 14 February 1947) is a Greek former football defender.

He played for Egaleo FC and transferred to PAO FC in 1968. He was 1971 European Cup runner up but didn't play at the final because Ferenc Puskás sent him back to Athens. However, he played in the 1971 Intercontinental Cup.

Mitropoulos won 3 Greek championships (1969, 1970, 1972) playing for Panathinaikos FC. He also played for Orpheus Aegaleo in Beta Ethniki from 1976 to 1977.

He later became president of Egaleo FC and president of the Hellenic League (EPAE).

References

1947 births
Living people
Panathinaikos F.C. players
Egaleo F.C. players
Association football defenders
Footballers from Athens
Greek footballers